The Prostacyclin receptor, also termed the prostaglandin I2 receptor or just IP, is a receptor belonging to the prostaglandin (PG) group of receptors. IP binds to and mediates the biological actions of prostacyclin (also termed Prostaglandin I2, PGI2, or when used as a drug, epoprostenol). IP is encoded in humans by the PTGIR gene. While possessing many functions as defined in animal model studies, the major clinical relevancy of IP is as a powerful vasodilator: stimulators of IP are used to treat severe and even life-threatening diseases involving pathological vasoconstriction.

Gene 
The  gene is located on human chromosome 19 at position q13.32 (i.e. 19q13.32), contains 6 exons, and codes for a G protein coupled receptor (GPCR) of the rhodopsin-like receptor family, Subfamily A14 (see rhodopsin-like receptors#Subfamily A14).

Expression 
IP is most highly expressed in brain and thymus and is readily detected in most other tissues. It is found throughout the vascular network on endothelium and smooth muscle cells.

Ligands

Activating ligands 
Standard prostanoids have the following relative efficacies as receptor ligands in binding to and activating IP: PGI2>>PGD2=PGE2=PGF2α>TXA2. In typical binding studies, PGI2 has one-half of its maximal binding capacity and cell-stimulating actions at ~1 nanomolar whereas the other prostaglandins are >50-fold to 100-fold weaker than this. However, PGI2 is very unstable, spontaneously converting to a far less active derivative 6-keto-PGF1 alpha within 1 minute of its formation. This instability makes defining the exact affinity of PGI2 for IP difficult. It also makes it important to have stable synthetic analogs of PGI2 for clinical usage. The most potent of these receptor agonists for binding to and activating IP are iloprost, taprostene, and esuberaprost which have Kd values (i.e. concentrations which bind to half of available IP receptors) in the low nanomole/liter range (http://www.guidetopharmacology.org/GRAC/ObjectDisplayForward?objectId=345/).

Inhibiting ligands 
Several synthetic compounds bind to, but do not activate, IP and thereby inhibit its activation by the activating ligands just described. These receptor antagonists include RO1138452, RO3244794, TG6-129, and BAY-73-1449, all of which have Kd values for IP at or beneath low nanomol/liter levels (http://www.guidetopharmacology.org/GRAC/ObjectDisplayForward?objectId=345/).

Mechanism of cell activation 
IP is classified as a relaxant type of prostenoid receptor based on its ability, upon activation, to relax certain pre-contracted smooth muscle preparations and smooth muscle-containing tissues such as those of pulmonary arteries and veins. When bound to PGI2 or other of its agonists, IP stimulates one or more of three types of G protein complexes, depending on cell type: a) Gs alpha subunit-Gβγ complexes which release Gs that then stimulates adenyl cyclase to raise intracellular levels of cAMP and thereby activate cAMP-regulated protein kinases A-dependent cell signaling pathways (see PKA); b) Gq alpha subunit-Gβγ complexes which release Gq that then stimulates other cell signaling pathways (e.g. phospholipase C/IP3/cell Ca2+ mobilization/diacylglycerol/protein kinase Cs, calmodulin-modulated myosin light chain kinase, RAF/MEK/Mitogen-activated protein kinases, PKC/Ca2+/Calcineurin/Nuclear factor of activated T-cells; and EGF cellular receptors; and c) Gi alpha subunit-Giβγ) complexes which releases Gi that then simulates phospholipase C to cleave phosphatidylinositol triphosphate into inositol triphosphate that raises intracellular CaCa2 levels thereby regulating Calcium signaling pathways and diacylglycerol that activates certain protein kinase C enzymes )that phosphorylate and thereby regulate target proteins involved in cell signaling (see Protein kinase C#Function). Studies suggest that stimulation of Gsβγ complexes is required for activation of the Gqβγ- and Giβγ-dependent pathways. In certain cells, activation of IP also stimulates G12/G13-Gβγ G proteins to activate the Rho family of GTPases signaling proteins and Gi-Gβγ G proteins to activateRaf/MEK/mitogen-activated kinase pathways.

Functions 
Studies using animals genetically engineered to lack IP and examining the actions of EP4 receptor agonists in animals as well as animal and human tissues indicate that this receptor serves various functions. It has been regarded as the most successful therapeutic target among the 9 prostanoid receptors.

Platelets 
IP gene knockout mice (i.e. IP(-/-) mice) exhibit increased tendency to thrombosis in response to experimentally-induced Endothelium, a result which appears to reflect, at least in part, the loss of IP's anti-platelet activity. IP activation of animal and human platelets inhibits their aggregation response and as one consequence of this inhibition of platelet-dependent blood clotting. The PGI2-IP axis along with the production of nitric oxide, acting together additively and potentially synergistically, are powerful and physiological negative regulators of platelet function and thereby blood clotting in humans. Studies suggest that the PGI2-IP axis is impaired in patients with a tendency to develop pathological thrombosis such as occurs in obesity, diabetes, and coronary artery disease.

Cardiovascular system 
IP activation stimulates the dilation of arteries and veins in various animal models as well as in humans. It increases the blood flow through, for example, the pulmonary, coronary, retinal and choroid circulation. Inhaled PGI2 causes a modest fall in diastolic and small fall in systolic blood pressure in humans. This action involves IP's ability to relax vascular smooth muscle and is considered to be one of the fundamental functions of IP receptors. Furthermore, IP(-/-) mice on a high salt diet develop significantly higher levels of hypertension, cardiac fibrosis, and cardiac hypertrophy than control mice. The vasodilating and, perhaps, platelet-inhibiting effects of IP receptors likely underlie its ability suppress hypertension and protect tissues such as the heart in this model as well as the heart, brain, and gastrointestinal tract in various animal models of ischemic injury. Indeed, IP agonists are used to treat patients pathological vasoconstriction diseases. The injection of IP activators into the skin of rodents increases local capillary permeability and swelling; IP(-/-) mice fail to show this increased capillary permeability and swelling in response not only to IP activators but also in a model of carrageenan- or bradykinin-induced paw edema. IP antagonists likewise reduce experimentally-induced capillary permeability and swelling in rats. This actions is also considered a physiological function of IP receptors, but can contribute to the toxicity of IP activators in patients by inducing, for example, life-threatening pulmonary edema.

IP activators inhibit the adherence of circulating platelets and leukocytes adherence to vascular endothelium thereby blocking their entry into sites of tissue disturbance. The activators also inhibit vascular smooth muscle cells from proliferation by blocking these cells' growth cycle and triggering their apoptosis (i.e. cell death). These actions, along with its anti-inflammatory effects, may underlie the ability of IP gene knockout in an ApoE(−/−) mouse model to cause an accelerated rate of developing atherosclerosis.

Inflammation 
Mouse studies indicate that the PGI2-IP axis activates cellular signaling pathways that tend to suppress allergic inflammation. The axis inhibits bone marrow-derived dendritic cells (i.e. antigen-presenting cells that process antigen material, present it on their surfaces for delivery to T cells, and otherwise regulate innate and adaptive immune system responses) from producing pro-inflammatory cytokines (e.g. IL-12, TNF-alpha, IL-1-alpha, and IL-6) while stimulating them to increase production of the anti-inflammatory cytokine, IL-10. IP receptor activation of these cells also blocks their lipopolysaccharide-stimulated expression of pro-inflammatory cell surface proteins (i.e. CD86, CD40, and MHC class II molecules) that are critical for developing adaptive immune responses. IL receptor-activated bone marrow-derived dendritic cells showed a greatly reduced ability to stimulate the proliferation of T helper cell as well as the ability of these cells to produce pro-allergic cytokines (i.e. IL-5 and IL-13)s. In a mouse model of allergic inflammation, PGI2 reduced the maturation and migration of lung mature dendritic cells to Mediastinal lymph nodes while increasing the egress of immature dendritic cells away from the lung. These effects resulted in a decrease in allergen-induced responses of the cells mediating allergic reactivity, TH-2 cells. These IP-induced responses likely contribute to its apparent function in inhibiting certain mouse inflammation responses as exemplified by the failure of IP receptor deficient mice to develop full lung airway allergic responses to ovalbumin in a model of allergic inflammation.

In human studies, PGI2 failed to alter bronchoconstriction responses to allergen but did protect against exercise-induced and ultrasonic water-induced bronchoconstriction in asthmatic patients. It also caused bronchodilation in two asthmatic patients. However, these studies were done before the availability of potent and selective IP agonists. These agonists might produce more effective inhibitor results on airways allergic diseases but their toxicity (e.g. pulmonary edema, hypotension) has tended to restrict there study in asthmatic patients.

IP receptors also appear involved in suppressing non-allergic inflammatory responses. IP receptor-deficient mice exhibit a reduction in the extent and progression of inflammation in a model of collagen-induced arthritis. This effect may result from regulating the expression of arthritis-related, pro-inflammatory genes (i.e. those for IL-6, VEGF-A, and RANKL). On the other hand, IP receptors may serve to promote non-allergic inflammatory responses: IP receptor-deficient mice exhibited increased lung inflammation in a model of bleomycin-induced pulmonary fibrosis while mice made to over-express the PGI2-forming enzyme, Prostacyclin synthase, in their airway epithelial cells were protected against lung injury in this model.

Pain perception 
IP(-/-) mice exhibit little or no writhing responses in an acetic acid-induced pain model. The mouse IP receptor also appears to be involved in the development of heat-induced hyperalgesia. These and further studies using IP receptor antagonists in rats indicate that IP receptors on pain-perceiving sensory neurons of the dorsal root ganglia as well as on certain neurons in the spinal cord transmit signals for pain, particularly pain triggered by inflammation.

Clinical significance

Toxicity 
IP receptor agonists, particularly when used intravenously, have been associated with the rapid development of pulmonary edema, hypotension, bleeding due to inhibition of platelet aggregation, and tachycardia. Clinical use of these agonists is contraindicated in patients suffering many conditions. For example, the IP agonist iloprost is contraindicated in patients with unstable angina; decompensated cardiac failure (unless under close medical supervision); severe cardiac arrhythmias; congenital or acquired heart valve defects; increased risk of bleeding; a history of myocardial infarction in the past 6 months; or a history of cerebrovascular events (e.g. stroke) within 3 months.

Vasoconstriction 
IP receptor agonists are front-line drugs to treat pulmonary hypertension. Major drugs in this category include PGI2 itself (i.e. epoprostenol), iloprost, treprostinil, and beraprost with epoprostenol being favored in some studies. However, newly developed IP agonists with favorable pharmacological features such as Selexipag have been granted by the US FDA Orphan Drug status for the treatment of pulmonary hypertension. IP agonists are also to treat severe vasoconstriction in Raynaud's disease, Raynaud's disease-like syndromes, and scleroderma. Epoprostenol causes improvements in hemodynamic parameters and oxygenation in patients suffering the acute respiratory distress syndrome but due to the limited number of randomized clinical trials and lack of studies investigating mortality, its use cannot be recommended as standard of care for this disease and should be reserved for those refractory to traditional therapies. A meta-analysis of 18 clinical trials on the use of prostanoids including principally IP receptor agonists on patients with severe lower limb peripheral artery disease due to diverse causes found that these drugs may reduce the extent of limb tissue that needed to be amputated. However, the studies did not support extensive use of prostanoids in patients with critical limb ischemia as an adjunct to revascularization or as an alternative to major amputation in cases which cannot undergo revascularization.

Thrombotic diseases 
IP receptor agonists have been used to treat Thromboangiitis obliterans, a disease involving blood clotting and inflammation of the small and medium-sized arteries and veins in the hands and feet.

Genomic studies 
An adenine (A) to cytosine (C) synonymous substitution at base 984 (i.e. A984C) in exon 3 of PTGIR''' is the most frequent single nucleotide polymorphism (SNP) variant in a sampling of Japanese. This variant was associated with an increase in platelet activation responses in vitro and an increase in incidence of cerebral ischemia. Two other synonymous SNP variants, V53V and S328S, in PTGIR in an Italian population study were associated with enhanced platelet activation response and deep vein thrombosis. The rare SNP variant 795C of 794T in the PTGIR gene is associated with an increased incidence of Aspirin-induced asthma and a greater percentage fall in the forced expiratory volume response of airways to inhalation of an aspirin like compound (lysine-acetyl salicylic acid) in a Korean population sample.

 See also 
 PTGIR'' gene (https://www.wikigenes.org/e/gene/e/5739.html)
 PGI2
 Prostaglandin receptors
 Eicosanoid receptor

References

Further reading

External links 
 
 

G protein-coupled receptors